The Walking Dead: A New Frontier is an episodic adventure video game based on The Walking Dead comic book series developed by Telltale Games. It is the sequel to The Walking Dead: Season Two, and the third game in The Walking Dead series. The first two episodes released on December 20, 2016, and a retail season pass disc edition released on February 7, 2017. The game employs the same narrative structure as the past seasons, where player choice in one episode will have a permanent impact on future story elements. The player choices recorded in save files from the first two seasons and the additional episode "400 Days" carry over into the third season.

The game takes place in the same fictional world as the comic, where a zombie apocalypse has caused society to collapse. The main characters of the game are mostly original characters; however, due to time skips in season two and between seasons two and three, the timeline is caught up to where the comics are. Clementine (voiced by Melissa Hutchison), who was the player's companion during the first season and the protagonist in season two, returns as a playable character, but the main protagonist of the season is an original character named Javier "Javi" Garcia (voiced by Jeff Schine). In A New Frontier, Javi and Clementine must work together with other survivors to rescue their respective families from the eponymous group, which Clementine used to be a member of.

Unlike the first two seasons, the game received mixed reviews from critics with praise aimed at its new cast of characters, updated engine, certain aspects of its choices and overall new direction, but criticism for the short episode lengths, treatment of the second season's endings, some of its characters, and Clementine's shift to a supporting role. A fourth and final season, titled The Walking Dead: The Final Season, was episodically released from August 26, 2018 to March 26, 2019.

Gameplay
Similar to the previous seasons, The Walking Dead: A New Frontier is a point-and-click adventure game. In contrast to previous seasons, there will be two playable characters: Clementine, the heroine from the previous games; and Javier, a new character introduced this season.  Players can direct the current character under their control around the environment, examine and interact with various scenery elements and collect and use objects to advance the story. The player can also initiate conversations with non-player characters via conversation trees. Certain replies from other characters may offer the player multiple choices to select from, including the option to stay silent, with a limited amount of time to make the selection; if the player does not select an option, the conversation will continue as if they had stayed quiet. Such choices can affect how the other characters will later react to the player-character which can influence later events in the story.  Other scenes are more action-oriented, requiring the player to complete quick time events to prevent the player-character or their allies from getting killed. If the player fails these events, the game will restart at the start of such scenes. Such action scenes may also require the player to make a key decision within a limited time frame, such as which of two characters to save from attacking walkers.

The player's choices and actions will impact story elements in later episodes; for example, a character that the player does not choose to be saved will not appear in later scenes. A New Frontier will incorporate player choices made in previous games in the series through existing save files; Telltale states they will offer multiple options for how players can bring in previous saves into the game, including for players that have switched their choice of platform prior to A New Frontier. A New Frontier will not be released on the PlayStation 3 or Xbox 360, but players that have saves from Season Two on these platforms will be able to download a patch on those consoles as to upload their saved game to Telltale's servers, and then access that from their new choice of platform. Telltale will also provide a separate tool for players to "quick-create a tailored backstory" for Clementine to this point, with a possible 42 different variations, and create a save file from which to start the new season with. Players may also opt to use the default backstory that Telltale has created as the basis for the game. Unlike the first two seasons, the third makes extensive use of flashback narrative structure.

Synopsis

Setting
The Walking Dead: A New Frontier follows on the first game, and coincides with events of the comic books, in which a zombie apocalypse has occurred, turning humans that are bitten or die into zombies, or "walkers"; the only way to stop this conversion is to damage the brain. The game is primarily set four years after the apocalypse began, and roughly two years after The Walking Dead: Season Two.

A New Frontier features two playable protagonists: Javier "Javi" Garcia (Jeff Schine), a former professional baseball player living with his sister-in-law Kate (Shelley Shenoy) and nephew, Gabe (Raymond Ochoa) and niece, Mariana (Vale de la Maza); and Clementine (Melissa Hutchison), a young teenager trying to survive on her own while continuing to look after Alvin Jr., the baby from the last season. Possibly also returning are either Kenny (Gavin Hammon) or Jane (Christine Lakin), depending on the player's decisions from the previous season. During the season, Javi's group is joined by Paul "Jesus" Monroe (Brandon Keener), the ambassador of the Hilltop community appearing in the comic series, and several survivors from the idyllic town of Prescott, including their leader Tripp (Troy Hall), town doctor Eleanor (Kelly Crowder), and bartender Conrad (William Christopher Stephens). Later episodes introduce the New Frontier, a larger group of survivors who have "lost their way" due to past events. The group is led by four people: Joan (Jayne Taini), the head of diplomacy; Dr. Paul Lingard (Yuri Lowenthal), the head of medicine; Clinton "Clint" Barnes (Andrew Heyl), the head of rations and food; and Javi's older brother and Kate's ex-husband David (Alex Hernandez), the head of security. Other members include David's right-hand woman Ava (Ally Johnson), and scouts Badger (Jon Curry), Max (Sean Lynch), and Lonnie (Charles Halford).

Plot

At the onset of the walker pandemic, Javi is living in Baltimore with David, Kate, Gabe, and Mariana. After Javi and David's father dies of cancer, he reanimates and bites their mother. David takes her to the hospital but doesn't return, while Javi and Kate eventually move on and set off on the road with Gabe and Mariana. Four years later, while scavenging for supplies at a junkyard, the four have a run-in with a group led by Max, Badger, and Lonnie. Javi is separated but is rescued by Clementine, who offers help in exchange for their family truck. Clementine takes Javi to Prescott—a fortified community within an old airfield—where he meets Tripp, Conrad, and Eleanor. Tripp and Eleanor agree to help rescue Javi's family. 

During their rescue attempt, Mariana is killed and Kate is critically wounded by Badger and his men. Clementine identifies one of the attackers as a member of the New Frontier—a large group of survivors she had once met, who have since turned corrupt. The group returns to Prescott to treat Kate's injuries, but Badger arrives with reinforcements and releases a horde of walkers, which overrun the town. Javi, Clementine, Kate, Gabe, Tripp, Eleanor, and Conrad escape and head to another survivor camp in Richmond, Virginia. They are later joined by Jesus, who reveals Richmond is now controlled by the New Frontier. Clementine admits to Javi that she used to be a member of the New Frontier, but Conrad listens to their conversation and suggests using Clementine as a bargaining chip to secure their safe entry into Richmond. Javi either accepts the plan or rejects it by killing Conrad.

The group reaches Richmond and is let in after David is called. While Kate and Gabe are taken to Dr. Lingard for medical care, David shows Javi around Richmond and explains he became the New Frontier's head of security after being unable to return to Baltimore. Although David is glad to have his family back, his relationship with Kate is deteriorating. Javi later meets with David, Joan, and Clint to argue his case for staying in Richmond. Max arrives and accuses Javi of stealing New Frontier supplies and killing his men at the junkyard. Although David supports Javi, Joan and Clint decide to exile him and his group. Before they leave, David asks the group to meet him at a warehouse, where Clementine accuses him of causing AJ's death; flashbacks reveal that Clementine and AJ were forced to travel alone until they met Ava, who invited them into the New Frontier. When AJ became deathly ill, Clementine attempted to steal medicine from Lingard to save his life, which caused David to exile her without AJ. David reveals that AJ recovered from his illness and Lingard knows his whereabouts. 

The group overhears Max, Badger, and Lonnie in the warehouse, and discovers the New Frontier is raiding other communities for supplies. They kill Badger and interrogate Max, who admits that Joan ordered the raids. Jesus takes his leave to warn his group while the others return to Richmond to confront Joan. If he was spared, Max exposes Joan's corruption to Clint. However, Joan turns on David by labeling him as a conspirator alongside Javi and prepares to hang him the next day at the town square. Javi escapes confinement and organizes his group, aiming to expose Joan and rescue David. He and Clementine meet up at the hospital, where Lingard, no longer able to cope with the New Frontier's actions, demands being killed by injection in exchange for information on AJ's whereabouts. Javi either capitulates to his demands or refuses, allowing Lingard to live. 

The next day, Kate admits her love for Javi, who has the option of reciprocating. Javi's bid to expose Joan at the hanging fails via a betrayal from Eleanor, and he is forced to choose between a captured Ava and Tripp to save him from execution. Joan murders whoever Javi chose to be spared, and Clint offers Javi a deal to peacefully leave Richmond with his group, which he can accept or refuse by killing Joan. Regardless, David is rescued as a firefight breaks out. Kate races into the square but crashes into a fence, which opens a breach and allows walkers to pour through. The group barricades themselves in an apartment building and plans on how to save Richmond. However, David views Richmond as a lost cause and suggests leaving the city. Jealous of Javi and Kate's growing closeness, David fights his brother until walkers begin to close in on them. As David leaves in a truck with Gabe, Kate decides to man a bulldozer help save Richmond; Javi must decide whether to pursue David or help Kate. Depending on the choices she made in her flashbacks, Clementine will either follow Javi's lead, split up from him, go after Gabe and David, or stay with Kate. Their choices result in Javi losing David, Gabe, and/or Kate. Jesus returns with reinforcements and helps the survivors round up the walkers and lead them out of Richmond, saving the town.

Days later, Javi memorializes the ones lost and meets Jesus, who suggests that he becomes Richmond's new leader. If he is still alive, Lingard tells Clementine where AJ is, and she decides to leave Richmond to find him. After Javi gives Clementine a new haircut, they bid goodbye and she departs.

Episodes
The game is separated into five episodes, like the first and second seasons.

Development
When Telltale Games acquired the right to make video games based on The Walking Dead comics, they signed a contract for a "multi-year, multi-platform, multi-title" license. This license went into effect after the success of the first season of The Walking Dead, when Telltale commissioned a second series of games based on the franchise. The first season was considered highly successful, helping to revitalize the adventure game genre which had been in decline since the mid-1990s, with Telltale being recognized as one of the top development studios in 2012.
 
During an interview on IGN's Up at Noon, writer Gary Whitta teased more The Walking Dead from Telltale sooner than later. "You won't have to wait for season two to play more Walking Dead", he claimed. "I can tell you what you already know, which is season two is coming. There's not much to say because it really is very early... it's a way off", said Whitta. "But, knowing that it's a way off, and knowing that people are hungry for more Walking Dead there may very well be more Walking Dead from Telltale before season two. We may have a little something extra for you between season one and two". Whitta continued to tease that something is in the works right now "that will make the wait for season two slightly less agonizing". This was revealed at the 2013 Electronic Entertainment Expo in June 2013 to be an additional episode called The Walking Dead: 400 Days that is available as downloadable content for the first season. It introduces five new characters that journalists expect to carry into Season Two. 400 Days will use data about the player's decisions in season one, and decisions made in 400 Days will carry into Season Two.

Telltale's Sean Ainsworth and Dennis Lenart stated that the third season features a "new angle" from the story. It was confirmed by Robert Kirkman that Clementine would return for Season 3. Robert Kirkman also said the game would almost be at the same point as the current comic timeline. He also said more comic-related events would happen. During a 2015 E3 Discussion with Greg Miller and Job Stauffer, Stauffer implied that Season 3 was "a long ways off" and "considerably larger" than previous games. Stauffer hinted that some Comic Series characters would appear in Season 3.

Season 3 was planned to tie in all the possible endings that players from previous seasons may have taken, but as well as to draw in new players to the series. With the planned influx of new players and those that have transitioned off older consoles and do not have access to save games, Telltale provided a story generator tool that asks the player several questions as to customize a starting point for A New Frontier. These questions were developed by evaluating around 40,000 playthroughs that covered Season One and Two, and grouping the general pattern of choices made by players into a total of 42 distinct scenarios, from which they derived questions that would help guide a new player to fall in one of these sets. Bruner said they were more looking at patterns of behavior rather than specific decisions that had been made; for example, the decision whether to kill Lee at his request before he turns or leave him at the end of Season One was found to be "representative of some pretty complicated motivations" of the sum of players' choices in the game, and thus wanted this story generator to capture the motivation rather than the result.

In an interview with IGN, Kirkman stated that the third season would bring the video game closer to the comic book's current time frame at the time of its planned release. This season takes place a few years after the second season, and includes a somewhat older Clementine along with AJ, the infant she rescues at the end of Season 2 and now a toddler. Clementine is a playable character along with a new character, Javier. Telltale adapted its previous data about player choices from the first two seasons, which were saved locally to a player's computer or console, to work with their new cloud-based saving approach, so that these previous choices will affect how the story in the third season will play out. The game uses the updated Telltale game engine that it is using for its Batman game.

During the 2016 PAX Expo, Telltale revealed the third season would be released in November 2016, with the subtitle A New Frontier. Telltale later had to delay the first episode's release until December 20, 2016. Warner Bros. Interactive Entertainment published retail versions of Season 3 as part of a deal with Telltale for Batman that was released in August 2016. The physical edition was expected to release on February 24, 2017 in North America and March 3, 2017 in Europe; it contained the first two episodes on disc and through digital codes to redeem the other episodes once they were available.

A Nintendo Switch version was scheduled for release in 2020.

Soundtrack
On September 10, 2019, an official soundtrack album of Jared Emerson-Johnson's score to the game was released for digital download and on streaming services, with a special edition set of vinyl lps due to release shortly thereafter.

Sequel
In July 2017, Telltale Games and Skybound Entertainment announced the fourth and final season titled The Walking Dead: The Final Season which was released from August 2018 to March 2019.

Reception

The Walking Dead: A New Frontier received mixed reviews from critics with praise aimed at its new cast of characters, updated engine, and overall new direction, but criticism for the short episode lengths, treatment of the second season's endings, and Clementine's shift to a supporting role.

Episode 1: Ties That Bind Part One
Aggregating review website Metacritic gave the Microsoft Windows version 81/100 based on 35 reviews, the PlayStation 4 version 80/100 based on 10 reviews and the Xbox One version 78/100 based on 14 reviews.

Episode 2: Ties That Bind Part Two
Aggregating review website Metacritic gave the Microsoft Windows version 80/100 based on 33 reviews, the PlayStation 4 version 80/100 based on 9 reviews and the Xbox One version 78/100 based on 13 reviews.

Episode 3: Above the Law
Aggregating review website Metacritic gave the Microsoft Windows version 75/100 based on 29 reviews, the PlayStation 4 version 69/100 based on 8 reviews and the Xbox One version 73/100 based on 6 reviews.

Episode 4: Thicker Than Water
Aggregating review website Metacritic gave the Microsoft Windows version 72/100 based on 28 reviews, the PlayStation 4 version 65/100 based on 5 reviews and the Xbox One version 73/100 based on 4 reviews.

Episode 5: From the Gallows
Aggregating review website Metacritic gave the Microsoft Windows version 74/100 based on 23 reviews, the PlayStation 4 version 71/100 based on 5 reviews and the Xbox One version 59/100 based on 6 reviews.

References

External links
 Official website

2016 video games
Android (operating system) games
Episodic video games
Interactive movie video games
IOS games
Nintendo Switch games
PlayStation 4 games
PlayStation Network games
PlayStation Vita games
Point-and-click adventure games
Telltale Games games
Video game sequels
Video games developed in the United States
Video games featuring female protagonists
Video games scored by Jared Emerson-Johnson
Video games set in Baltimore
Video games set in Virginia
Video games set in Ohio
Video games set in 2007
Video games with alternate endings
Video games with cel-shaded animation
Windows games
Xbox Cloud Gaming games
Xbox One games
New Frontier
Video games with commentaries